Major-General John Randoll Mackenzie of Suddie (c. 1763 – 28 July 1809) was a senior British Army officer who saw action in the Napoleonic Wars.

Early life
MacKenzie was the son of William Mackenzie of Suddie and Margaret Mackenzie (daughter of Sir Alexander Mackenzie, 5th Baronet).

Military career
Mackenzie was commissioned as a second lieutenant in the Marines in 1778. After serving in India, he secured a commission as a captain in the 78th Regiment of Foot when it was raised in 1793 and was deployed to the Dutch Cape Colony in 1795. He was elected as member of parliament for Tain Burghs in 1806 and then transferred to Sutherland in 1808. Deployed to Spain for service in the Peninsular War, he commanded a brigade in the 3rd Division and also became the first General Officer Commanding 3rd Division when it was formed on 18 June 1809. He was killed in action at the Battle of Talavera on 28 July 1809.

References

1809 deaths
British Army generals
78th Highlanders officers
British Army personnel of the Peninsular War
1760s births
British military personnel killed in action in the Napoleonic Wars